Rochefort's Escape is a painting by Édouard Manet painted in around 1881, currently in the Kunsthaus Zürich. It depicts the 1874 escape of Victor Henri Rochefort, Marquis de Rochefort-Luçay from captivity in New Caledonia to which he had been sentenced for his role in the Paris Commune. The genre of history painting traditionally dealt with historic and mythological topics, and Rochefort's Escape is considered highly significant for its depiction of an event still fresh in public memory. A second smaller version of the painting is in the Musée d'Orsay.

References

Paintings by Édouard Manet
Maritime paintings
1881 paintings